Nezlobnaya is a rural locality (a stanitsa) in Georgiyevsky District of Stavropol Krai, Russia, located  from Georgiyevsk, the administrative center of the district. Population:

References

Rural localities in Stavropol Krai